Orleton is a small village and civil parish in northern Herefordshire, England, at . The population of the civil parish at the 2011 census was 794.
The village church is dedicated to St George, and contains a Norman nave, 14th-century stained-glass windows, and a 13th-century west tower. The c.1200 door was moved and reset, The early 13th-century chancel has lancet windows. The tie-beam roof may be 14th century. The vestry is Victorian. Fittings include a c.1100 Norman font with nine disciples standing under arches, a 17th-century Jacobean pulpit, two thirteenth-century dug-out chests, a clock dating from about 1700, and a Norman carving of a dragon, later used as a clock weight.

The 13th-century Bishop of Hereford, Adam Orleton, took his name from this village, may have been born here, and was a constant supporter of Roger Mortimer, the lord of the manor.

References

External links

 Orleton Village The community website for Orleton

Villages in Herefordshire
Civil parishes in Herefordshire